Torcy is a commune in the Seine-et-Marne department in the Île-de-France region in north-central France. It is located in the eastern suburbs of Paris,  from the center of Paris.

Torcy is a sub-prefecture of the department and the seat of an arrondissement. The commune of Torcy is part of the Val Maubuée sector, one of the four sectors in the "new town" of Marne-la-Vallée.

Transport
Torcy is served by Torcy station on Paris RER line A.

Demographics
Inhabitants of Torcy are called Torcéens.

The suburbanization and affluence of the Vietnamese population in France has resulted in a demographic shift in Torcy since the 1980s. Vietnamese businesses and community organizations have been established in Torcy, and the commune, along with nearby Ivry-sur-Seine, contains one of the highest concentrations of Vietnamese people in France at 10% to 20% of the population. As of 1998, about 5-6% of the city's population is made up of East Asians.

Education
There are ten public primary school groups (preschool and elementary) in Torcy, along with three junior high schools and one senior high school.

Junior high schools:
 Collège de l'Arche-Guédon
 Collège Louis-Aragon
 Collège Victor-Schoelcher

Senior high school
 Lycée Jean-Moulin

See also
 Communes of the Seine-et-Marne department

References

External links

 Official site 
 1999 Land Use, from IAURIF (Institute for Urban Planning and Development of the Paris-Île-de-France région) 
 

Communes of Seine-et-Marne
Subprefectures in France
Little Saigons
Val Maubuée